Isak Helstad Amundsen (born 14 October 1999) is a Norwegian footballer who plays as a defender for Bodø/Glimt.

Club career
Amundsen was born in Brønnøysund. He made his senior debut for Brønnøysund on 31 May 2014 against Drag; Brønnøysund won 9–0.

On 18 February 2020, Amundsen signed his first professional contract with Bodø/Glimt. Amundsen made his senior debut for Bodø/Glimt on 1 July 2020 against Odd, with Bodø/Glimt winning 4–0.

Career statistics

Club

Honours

Club
Bodø/Glimt
Eliteserien (1):  2020

References

1999 births
Living people
People from Brønnøy
Norwegian footballers
Norwegian Fourth Division players
Eliteserien players
Association football defenders
FK Bodø/Glimt players
Tromsø IL players
Sportspeople from Nordland